The following is a list of people executed by the U.S. state of Oklahoma since 1976.

The total amounts to 120 people, and all were executed by lethal injection.

Notes

See also 
 Capital punishment in Oklahoma
 Capital punishment in the United States

References 

People executed by Oklahoma
Oklahoma
People executed
Executions